The Waipara River drain from the Bonar Glacier on Mount Aspiring / Tititea before joining the Arawhata River and flowing northwest into the Tasman Sea near Jackson Bay. Its name translates to "Muddy Water", wai meaning water and para meaning mud.

See also
List of rivers of New Zealand

References

Westland District
Rivers of the West Coast, New Zealand
Rivers of New Zealand